United States Army Regional Correctional Facility – Europe (USARCF-E) is the only Department of Defense, Level 1 corrections facility in the European theater and is located on the outskirts of Coleman Army Airfield near Mannheim, Germany.

USACF-E falls up under the 18th MP BDE.  At the same time reports directly to the United States Army Corrections Command in Alexandria, Virginia.

Mission statement
The United States Army Regional Correctional Facility-Europe provides level 1 pre-trial and post-trial correctional services, conducts prisoner transfers to Contiguous United States (CONUS) correctional facilities, and on order provides advisory teams in support of full spectrum operations.

Organization structure
The USARCF-E staff primarily consists of Army soldiers assigned to the 18th Military Police Brigade. These soldiers are joined by several members of the Air Force and the Navy who serve as the liaisons for their respective service personnel incarcerated within the facility and also assist in the daily operations of the facility. The staff is rounded out by both Department of Army civilians and local national employees.

History

With the ongoing realignment of US forces in Europe all facilities in Mannheim are to be closed no later than 31 August 2013 and the Army is currently preparing to move this facility to Sembach Kaserne.

Additional photos

References

Buildings and structures in Baden-Württemberg
Mannheim
Prisons in Germany
United States Army Corrections Command
Installations of the United States Army
Military prisons
Military installations of the United States in Germany